This article contains a list of results of the England Knights.

Overview

2010s

References 

Rugby league in England